Eimear Lambe (born 11 August 1997) is an Irish rower. She competed in the women's coxless four event at the 2020 Summer Olympics and won a bronze medal. Along with her team-mates, she was named as the Irish Times/Sport Ireland Sportswoman for July 2021.

Eimear was awarded a UCD Ad Astra Elite Athlete Scholarship  and graduated from University College Dublin with a Bachelor of Commerce degree International (BComm Int) in 2019. 

Eimear Lambe is the recipient of the 2022 UCD Alumni Award in Law

References

External links
 
 Eimear Lambe at Rowing Ireland
 

1997 births
Living people
Irish female rowers
Olympic rowers of Ireland
People from Cabra, Dublin
Rowers at the 2014 Summer Youth Olympics
Rowers at the 2020 Summer Olympics
Medalists at the 2020 Summer Olympics
Olympic medalists in rowing
Olympic bronze medalists for Ireland
21st-century Irish women
20th-century Irish women